Patrick Conrad (born 16 July 1945 in Antwerp) is a Flemish poet, screenwriter and novelist, and one of the founders of The Pink Poets. He also directed about twenty movies for cinema and television, including –  selected for the Cannes Festival – Mascara with Charlotte Rampling and Michael Sarrazin. He is also working as a painter and had two retrospective exhibitions of his work: in 1975 (Museum of Fine Arts of Antwerp) and 2005 (Museum Elzenveld, Antwerp). He lives in Provence, in the south of France.

Bibliography 

 Cezar and Jezabel (poems) (1963)
 Ik lig in de dalai-lama (poems) (1964)
 Rose mon chameau (poems) (1965)
 Een pop van Patrick Conrad met Pola Negri in de rol van Eleonora (poems) (1966)
 Mercantile marine engineering (poems) (1967)
 11 Sad Songs for Edward Kienholz (poems) (1971)
 De kleine dood van Kasper Q. (novel) (1971)
 Allegria! Allegria! (short stories) (1972)
 Continental Hotel of De duisternis der dingen loert (poems) (1975)
 Le déjeuner sur l'herbe (poems) (1975)
 Requiem (poems) (1975)
 Hugues C. Pernath (essay) (1976)
 La mort s'appelle bonsoir (poems) (1977)
 Roxy's Roxane (illustrated script) (1981)
 De vernieling (poems) (1985)
 De tranen van Mary Pickford (poems) (1991)
 Ba! (novel) (1993)
 Limousine (Thriller) (1994)
 Bloemlezing uit de poëzie van Patrick Conrad (book about Conrad by Daan Carstens with a choice of poems) (1995)
 Louisiana (thriller) (1996)
 Annalen (poems) (1998)
 Luwte (thriller) (1998)
 Op de Franse duinen (thriller) (1998)
 Good morning, Hoboken (thriller) (1999)
 Cargo (thriller) (2000)
 Slachtvee (novelization of his movie) (1980)
 De Aap van God (thriller) (2001)
 Starr (thriller) (2006)
 Leven en werk van Marcel Van Acker (Illustrated novel) (2009)
 Getande raadsels (essay about Hugo Claus) (2009)
 Perdida's Droom (Roman Noir) (2010)
 "De Geur van de Maan"  (roman noir) (2012)
 "Tango Assasino" (roman noir) (2013)
 "WALKER - De onvoltooide roamance van Ediapaso Gianovoltare" (Roman noir) 2014
 "AS - Verzalmelde gedichten 1963-2014" (complete poems) 2015
 "Moço" (Roman noir) 2015
 "De Cadillac van Mallarmé" (poems) 2016
 "Residentie van Artevelde" (Roman noir) 2016
 "Diep in December" (Roman noir) 2017
Some of Conrads work has been translated in the UK (Random House), the U.S.A. (Viking Press) and Germany (Verlagshaus n°8)
In 2012 Starr was published by Bitter Lemon Press under the title NO SALE (Translation Jonathan Lynn);

Filmography

 Les wagons verts-réséda (1967) Director
 Un soir, un train (1968) Actor – Le maître d'hôtel
 Slijk (1972) Director
 Slachtvee (1979) Director/Writer
 Een vrouw tussen hond en wolf (1979) Actor – Fregoli
 Ieder mens die sterft is een museum dat brandt (1982) Director
 Maria Danneels (of het leven dat we droomden) (1982) Actor
 Parlez-moi d'amour (1983) Director
 Na de liefde (1983) Actor – Guido
 L'agenda d'Agenor (1983) Director
 Permeke (1985) Director - Writer
 Mascara (1987) Director - Writer
 Hector (1987) Actor – Filmregisseur
 Het sacrament (1990) Producer

Awards 
Literature
 1969 – Arkprijs van het Vrije Woord
 1971 – Poetry prize of 'De Vlaamse Gids'
 1976 – Poetry prize of de Province of Antwerp
 2008 – Diamant Bullit Award (Best Thriller of the Netherlands and Belgium) for Starr.
 2015 - Hercule Poirot Award (Best Flemish thriller) for ‘Moço’.
Film
 1967 Prize of the experimental short movie for Les wagons verts-réséda, Benelux Filmfestival.
 1985 Prize of the video production for Parlez-moi d'amour, festival of Nyons, Switzerland.
 1985 Oecumenique Prize for Parlez-moi d'amour, Festival of Nyons, Switzerland.
 1986 Grand prix for Parlez-moi d'amour, Festival Video Réalité, Brussels.
 1985 Special Prize of the Jury for Permeke, festival de Nyons, Switzerland.
 1985 Prize of the Public for Permeke, festival de Nyons, Switzerland.
 1985 Prix Femina for Permeke.
 1985 André Cavens Award – Prize for the best Belgian Movie of the year for Permeke.
 1986 Bert Leysen Prize (Prize for the best Belgian Television Movie 1985/86) for DadaTristesse.

See also 

 1969 : Sinaal prijs voor poëzie.
 Flemish literature

Sources 
 Patrick Conrad op Misdaadauteurs
 Patrick Conrad
 Patrick Conrad
 G. J. van Bork en P. J. Verkruijsse, De Nederlandse en Vlaamse auteurs (1985)
 

1945 births
Flemish writers
Living people
Ark Prize of the Free Word winners